John Henry Derrick (8 December 1891 – 22 April 1938) was an English professional footballer who made over 130 appearances as a forward in the Football League for Nottingham Forest.

Personal life 
In June 1915, 10 months after the outbreak of the First World War, Derrick enlisted as a private in the Leicestershire Regiment. While serving with the 2nd Battalion of the regiment, he was wounded in Mesopotamia in April 1916. Derrick died following an operation for "gastric trouble" at Nottingham City Hospital in April 1938 and was buried in Wilford Hill Cemetery.

Career statistics

References 

English footballers
English Football League players
Association football forwards
Nottingham Forest F.C. players
1891 births
1938 deaths
Association football outside forwards
Footballers from Nottingham
Aberaman Athletic F.C. players
British Army personnel of World War I
Military personnel from Nottingham
Royal Leicestershire Regiment soldiers

Loughborough Corinthians F.C. players